Knockando House Halt railway station served the village of Knockando, Moray, Scotland from 1869 to 1965 by the Strathspey Railway.

History 
The station was a private station, serving Knockando House, opening as Knockando on 1 September 1869 by the Great North of Scotland Railway. Its name was changed to Knockando House Platform on 1 May 1905 and later changing to Knockando House Halt. It was closed on 18 October 1965.

References

External links 

Disused railway stations in Moray
Railway stations in Great Britain opened in 1869
Railway stations in Great Britain closed in 1965
Beeching closures in Scotland
1863 establishments in Scotland
1965 disestablishments in Scotland
Former Great North of Scotland Railway stations